"He Will, She Knows" is a song recorded by American country music artist Kenny Rogers.  It was released in July 2000 as the first single from the album There You Go Again.  The song reached #32 on the Billboard Hot Country Singles & Tracks chart.  The song was written by Frank Rogers and Steve Leslie and features harmony vocals from Collin Raye and Diamond Rio.

Chart performance

Notes

References

2000 singles
2000 songs
Kenny Rogers songs
Collin Raye songs
Diamond Rio songs
Songs written by Frank Rogers (record producer)